Alexander Mikhailovich Schwarzman (born 18 September 1967 in Moscow) is an international grandmaster in international draughts, Russian draughts and Brazilian draughts from Russia. He is known for his creative playing style, especially his positional sacrifices and his high number of elegant games involving encirclements.

Notable achievements
World champion (international draughts) 1998, 2007, 2009, 2017, 2021.
World champion (Brazilian draughts) 1987, 1989, 1993, 1996, 1997, 2008, 2018
Russian national champion (international draughts) 1993, 1996, 2003, 2004 and 2008.
Russian national champion (Russian draughts) 1987, 1989, 1993, 1996 and 1997.
Winner of Bijlmer Tournament 1997, 1998 and 2006.
European champion 2002.

Schwarzman is the only grandmaster in three types of draughts: Brazilian, Russian and international.

References

External links
Alexander Schwarzman. Koninklijke Nederlandse Dambond

Russian draughts players
Soviet draughts players
1967 births
Living people
Players of international draughts
Players of Russian draughts
20th-century Russian people